Olzie Whitehead Williams House is a historic home located near Wilson, Wilson County, North Carolina.  It was built about 1860, and is a single-story, six-bay, "L"-shaped, Italianate style frame house with a gabled projecting end pavilion.  It rests on a low brick pier foundation and is sheathed in weatherboard.  The front facade features a shed roofed verandah.

It was listed on the National Register of Historic Places in 1983.

References

Houses on the National Register of Historic Places in North Carolina
Italianate architecture in North Carolina
Houses completed in 1860
Houses in Wilson County, North Carolina
National Register of Historic Places in Wilson County, North Carolina